Tête de l'Étret is a mountain in the French Alps, located in the Massif des Écrins.

See also
 List of mountains of the Alps

Mountains of Isère
Mountains of the Alps
Alpine three-thousanders